Bernard-Claude Panet (January 9, 1753 – February 14, 1833) was a Roman Catholic priest and Archbishop of Quebec.

Born in Quebec City, the son of Jean-Claude Panet, he was from a family of 14 children. He had two siblings who gained some fame in Canadian history; Jean-Antoine Panet who became a Lower Canada politician and Jacques Panet who also became a priest.

He was educated at the Petit Séminaire and the Grand Séminaire of Québec. He was ordained a priest in 1778, and began his career as a teacher. One of his noteworthy students was Joseph-Octave Plessis who eventually preceded Panet as archbishop of the Roman Catholic Archdiocese of Quebec.

References 
 
 Catholic Encyclopedia

1753 births
1833 deaths
Roman Catholic archbishops of Quebec
19th-century Roman Catholic archbishops in Canada
Burials at the Cathedral-Basilica of Notre-Dame de Québec